Gymnarchus niloticus – commonly known as the aba, aba aba, frankfish, freshwater rat-tail, poisson-cheval, or African knifefish – is an electric fish, and the only species in the genus Gymnarchus and the family Gymnarchidae within the order Osteoglossiformes. It is found in swamps, lakes and rivers in the Nile, Turkana, Chad, Niger, Volta, Senegal, and Gambia basins.

Description and biology

G. niloticus has a long and slender body, with no caudal, pelvic, or anal fins. The dorsal fin is elongated, running along the back of the fish towards the blunt, finless tail, and is the main source of propulsion.

G. niloticus is nocturnal and has a poor vision. Instead, it navigates and hunts smaller fish using a weak electric field, as demonstrated by the zoologist Hans Lissmann in 1950, when he noticed that it could swim equally well forwards or backwards, clearly relying on a sense other than vision. This opened up research into electroreception and electrogenesis in fish. Like the related elephantfish, which hunts the same way, it possesses an unusually large brain, which is believed to help it interpret the electrical signals. It can make its tail negatively charged with respect to its head. This produces a symmetrical electric field around its body. Nearby objects distort this field, and it can sense the distortion on its skin.

The adults continue to guard the young after hatching. The sperm cells lack a flagellum, moving like an amoeba instead.

References

Osteoglossiformes
Fish of Lake Turkana
Monotypic ray-finned fish genera
Taxa named by Georges Cuvier